Nazarovsky District is an administrative and municipal district (raion), one of the forty-three in Krasnoyarsk Krai, Russia. It is located in the southwest of the krai and borders with Achinsky District in the north, Kozulsky District in the east, Balakhtinsky District in the southeast, Uzhursky District in the south, Sharypovsky District in the west, and with Bogotolsky District in the northwest. Its administrative center is the town of Nazarovo (which is not administratively a part of the district). Population:  24,265 (2002 Census);

History
The district was established on April 4, 1924.

Administrative and municipal status
Within the framework of administrative divisions, Nazarovsky District is one of the forty-three in the krai. The town of Nazarovo serves as its administrative center, despite being incorporated separately as a krai town—an administrative unit with the status equal to that of the districts. The district is divided into ten selsoviets.

As a municipal division, the district is incorporated as Nazarovsky Municipal District and is divided into ten rural settlements (corresponding to the administrative district's selsoviets). The krai town of Nazarovo is incorporated separately from the district as Nazarovo Urban Okrug.

References

Notes

Sources

Districts of Krasnoyarsk Krai
States and territories established in 1924